Wild, Wild Women is a British television sitcom that aired on BBC from 1968 to 1969. Shot in black-and-white, it starred Barbara Windsor and was written by Ronald Wolfe and Ronald Chesney.

Cast

Pilot
Barbara Windsor – Millie
Derek Francis – Mr Harcourt
Penelope Keith – Daisy
Sonia Fox – Ruby
Jennie Paul – Blossom
Ronnie Stevens – Clarence
David Stoll – Lord Hurlingham
Zena Howard – Lady Hurlingham

Series
Barbara Windsor – Millie
Paul Whitsun-Jones – Mr Harcourt
Pat Coombs – Daisy
Ken Platt – Albert
Toni Palmer – Ruby
Jessie Robins – Blossom
Daphne Heard – Ginny
Yvonne Paul – Flo
Anna Karen – Maude
Joan Sanderson – Mrs Harcourt

Outline
This period sitcom, set in 1902, was a variation of The Rag Trade, which was also written by Chesney and Wolfe. Barbara Windsor, who also starred in The Rag Trade, played Millie, a cockney woman who led the women in a milliner's shop. The storylines focused around the conflict between the female workers and the management, Mr Harcourt and his apprentice Albert. Reflecting the mood of Britain in the late 1960s, the women adopted a new feisty spirit not seen in most characters in The Rag Trade. In the pilot the women were shown as strong supporters of the suffragette movement, but it was decided not to make much of this in the series.

The series failed to attract the same popularity as The Rag Trade, and was decommissioned after the first series. Only episode 3 still exists.

Episodes

Comedy Playhouse Pilot (1968)
Pilot (24 May 1968)

Series One (1969)
Episode One (6 January 1969)
Episode Two (13 January 1969)
Episode Three (20 January 1969)
Episode Four (27 January 1969)
Episode Five (3 February 1969)
Episode Six (10 February 1969)

References
Specific

General
Mark Lewisohn, Radio Times Guide to TV Comedy, BBC Worldwide Ltd, 2003

External links
 

Fiction set in 1902
1968 British television series debuts
1969 British television series endings
1960s British sitcoms
BBC television sitcoms
Comedy Playhouse
Lost BBC episodes